One Million B.C. is a 1940 American fantasy film produced by Hal Roach Studios and released by United Artists. It is also known by the titles Cave Man, Man and His Mate and Tumak.

The film stars Victor Mature as protagonist Tumak, a young caveman who strives to unite the uncivilized Rock Tribe and the peaceful Shell Tribe, Carole Landis as Loana, daughter of the Shell Tribe chief and Tumak's love interest, and Lon Chaney Jr. as Tumak's stern father and leader of the Rock Tribe. Chaney's billing differs from that of his home studio Universal Pictures in that Hal Roach elected to retain the "Jr." instead of billing him under his father's name, possibly because Roach was co-directing the film with his own son Hal Roach Jr.

The film was a popular success and was nominated for two Academy Awards for its special effects and musical score.

Plot

A group of modern-day hikers caught in a storm seek shelter in a cave. They encounter an anthropologist who interprets prehistoric carvings that introduce the story of a young caveman.

Akhoba, head of the Rock Tribe, leads a hunting party. His son Tumak begs the right to his first kill, a small Triceratops which he wrestles to death. An elderly man in the party falls from a cliff and is left to die. The party arrives at the Rock Tribe's cave with their prey. The beast is cooked on a fire. When it is done, the strongest feed first, next the women and children, then the few elderly pick the scraps. Tumak defends his portion from demands by Akhoba. They fight and Akhoba knocks Tumak over a cliff as his mother watches. Tumak recovers to find a Woolly Mammoth attacking him. He runs and climbs a tree. The Mammoth rams the tree and knocks it into a river.

Tumak floats downstream unconscious and is found by Loana of the Shell Tribe. Her tribesmen answer her shell horn call and take Tumak to their cave. The tribe gathers for a meal of vegetables, shared orderly with the children, women and elderly served first. Tumak awakes and Loana gives him food, which he guards as he eats, perplexing the tribe who share and do not fight. Tumak looks on, confused by the customs of the Shell Tribe.

Meanwhile, Akhoba leads a hunting party into the hills but is injured trying to take down a Muskox. As Akhoba lies injured, a younger hunter asserts authority over the others and takes Akhoba's place as leader, leaving Akhoba to die. Later, Akhoba, crippled, shows up at the cave but is treated with contempt.

Tumak adjusts slowly to life with the Shell Tribe. He helps the children gather food by shaking fruit out of a tree and they teach him how to laugh. He tries to fish with Loana but grows frustrated, as spearfishing is not like land hunting. While he is fishing, an Allosaurus traps a child in a tree. Tumak uses a borrowed spear to kill the dinosaur and save the child, but does not want to return the spear to its owner. Later that night, Tumak steals the spear and a hammer from their maker, and attacks him when he tries to reclaim them. The tribal leader, Loana's father, banishes Tumak.

As Tumak departs, Loana, who has fallen in love with him, leaves her tribe to follow him, much to his dismay. Tumak pulls apples from a tree for himself, ignoring Loana. Seeing that she has trouble reaching apples herself, he relents and helps her. Along the way, they spot an Glyptodont which chases them up a tree. Later, as Tumak and Loana reach Rock Tribe territory, they are trapped in a fissure during a fight between a Dimetrodon and a lizard-like dinosaur. Loana escapes, but is menaced by the leader who previously displaced Akhoba. She blows her shell horn, leading Tumak to her rescue. He saves her by defeating the leader and becomes the new leader.

Tumak has Loana handle the meals, which confuses the Rock Tribe, since she feeds the women and children first, then Akhoba whom she has sat on his former throne, and then the other elders. Lastly, Tumak and the able-bodied men are fed. The next day, Akhoba comes outside to see his tribe learning to gather fruits and vegetables, with Loana showing them which are good to eat and which are not. Loana and Tumak sit and talk, but Tumak is called away to help hunt a deer while Loana helps search for a missing child.
 
A nearby volcano erupts, scattering the Rock Tribe and destroying their cave. A child's mother is engulfed by a lava flow to death; Loana saves the child but is cut off from the others by the lava flow. She and the child head to the Shell Tribe. Many animals fall into the crevasses opened by the eruption. Tumak searches for Loana but finds only a scrap of her clothing near the lava flow and presumes her to be dead.

Later, a Shell tribesman seeks out Tumak and tells him that Loana is still alive, but the Shell Tribe is trapped in their cave by a large Monitor lizard-like dinosaur. Tumak leads his men to attack and kill the animal. Akohba and the women with the children follow. The Shell Tribe hold off the beast with torches. Tumak's direct spear attack is futile. Akhoba advises Tumak to distract the dinosaur while the rest of the men climb to higher ground. They start a rockslide that kills the beast. The formerly despised Akhoba becomes recognized for his experience and wisdom. The two tribes unite as one. Tumak, Loana, and the rescued child are framed in the dawn of a new day.

Cast

 Victor Mature as Tumak
 Carole Landis as Loana
 Lon Chaney Jr. as Akhoba
 Conrad Nagel as Bearded narrator in cave
 John Hubbard as Ohtao
 Nigel De Brulier as Peytow
 Mamo Clark as Nupondi
 Inez Palange as Tohana
 Edgar Edwards as Skakana
 Jacqueline Dalya as Soaka
 Mary Gale Fisher as Wandi
 Norman Budd as Rock tribe member
 Harry Wilson as Rock tribe member
 John Northpole as Rock tribe member
 Lorraine Rivero as Rock tribe member
 Harold Howard as Rock tribe member

Production
Producer Hal Roach hired D. W. Griffith to produce this film and Of Mice and Men, writing to him, "I need help from the production side to select the proper writers, cast, etc. and to help me generally in the supervision of these pictures."

Griffith reportedly wrote a script based on a French novel by Eugene Roche.

Although Griffith eventually disagreed with Roach over the production and parted, Roach later insisted that some of the scenes in the completed film were directed by Griffith. This would make the film the final production in which Griffith was actively involved. But cast members recall Griffith directing only the screen tests and costume tests. When Roach advertised the film in late 1939 with Griffith listed as producer, Griffith asked that his name be removed.

Victor Mature had just made his film debut in Hal Roach's The Housekeeper's Daughter. Roach had signed him to a seven-year contract.

"Griffith did all the tests", recalled Mature. "He tested for six months. I don't know what he was looking for. They'd have been better off letting the old man direct the picture. One day he just wasn't around any more."

Lon Chaney Jr. had just made Of Mice and Men for Roach.

"I had to 'ugh' my way through that picture", said Mature.

The film was nominated for two Academy Awards: Best Musical Score (Werner R. Heymann) and Best Special Effects (Roy Seawright, Elmer Raguse). The "dinosaurs" and "prehistoric mammals" seen in the film include a pig in a rubber Triceratops suit, a man in an Allosaurus suit, Asian elephants with fake tusks and fur made to look like Woolly Mammoths, Two dogs, Brahman cattle with fake horns and fur made to look like muskoxen, a sun bear cub, a six-banded armadillo with horns glued on to look like a Glyptodont, a young alligator with a Dimetrodon-like sail glued on its back, a rhinoceros iguana, a snake, a coati played as an oversized Megistotherium, a monitor lizard, an Anolis and an Argentine black and white tegu.

Reception
The film drew mixed reviews from critics. B. R. Crisler of The New York Times called the film "a masterpiece of imaginative fiction...You are almost certain to like something about 'One Million, B. C.'" Variety called it "corny", adding, "There isn't much sense to the action nor much interest in the characters." Harrison's Reports praised the "good technical work" and called the volcanic eruption "most thrilling", but said the storyline and romance were "slightly silly, and only tend to bore one." Film Daily called the film a "decided novelty" that was "full of thrills" and had "excellent" direction. John Mosher of The New Yorker wrote, "Being skimpy with its dinosaurs, 'One Million B.C.' won't tickle the gizzards of paleontologists."

Legacy
Footage from this film, as well as numerous unused scenes and outtakes, went into a stock footage library. This footage was then used by numerous companies through the years by producers who wanted to save money on costly special effects shots in films that featured dinosaurs. Even a few Westerns used footage of rockslides and volcanoes from this film. Because of this, footage from this film appeared in numerous films throughout the 1940s, 1950s and 1960s. These films include Tarzan's Desert Mystery (1943), one of the chapters of the serial film Superman (1948), Atom Man vs. Superman (1950), Two Lost Worlds (1950), The Lost Volcano (1950; one of the films in the Bomba, the Jungle Boy series), the American version of Godzilla Raids Again (1955) known as Gigantis the Fire Monster (1959), Jungle Manhunt (1951; one of the films in the Jungle Jim series), Smoky Canyon (1952), the "Yesterday's World" episode of The Schaefer Century Theatre (1952), Untamed Women (1952), Robot Monster (1953), The Lost Planet (1953), King Dinosaur (1955), the Three Stooges short film Space Ship Sappy (1957), Teenage Caveman (1958), She Demons (1958), Valley of the Dragons (1961), Journey to the Center of Time (1967), Horror of the Blood Monsters (1970; the stock footage was tinted in color for this film), the Mexican films Island of the Dinosaurs (La isla de los dinosaurios 1967), Adventure at the Center of the Earth (Aventura al centro de la tierra; 1966) and The Ghost Jesters (Los fantasmas burlones; 1964), One Million AC/DC (1970), TerrorVision (1986) and Attack of the B Movie Monster (1989). The technique of using optically enlarged lizards and baby crocodilians to represent dinosaurs has been given the nickname of "slurpasaur" by fans.

The film was remade as One Million Years B.C. (1966) starring John Richardson as Tumak and Raquel Welch as Loana. The external scenes were filmed in the Canary Islands.

The film features several scenes of animal cruelty, including a young alligator with a Dimetrodon-like sail glued to its back made to fight against a tegu, which is severely injured. This film caused the Society for the Prevention of Cruelty to Animals (SPCA) to ban many of the treatments of animals that occurred during the production.

The film has been colorized.

References

External links
 
 
 
 
 

1940 films
1940s fantasy films
1940s monster movies
American black-and-white films
Giant monster films
Films about dinosaurs
Prehistoric people in popular culture
1940s English-language films
Films directed by Hal Roach
Films about cavemen
American fantasy films
United Artists films
Animal cruelty incidents in film
1940s American films